Kenneth Allen Dowell (born January 19, 1961) is an American former professional baseball shortstop. He played in Major League Baseball (MLB) for the 1987 Philadelphia Phillies,

A native of Sacramento, California, Dowell batted and threw right-handed. After being released by the Phillies on November 6, 1987, he continued his Minor League Baseball (MiLB) career, playing for three additional seasons, with the New York Mets’ and  Atlanta Braves’ Triple-A affiliates.

Teams
Helena Phillies 1980
Spartanburg Traders 1981
Peninsula Pilots 1982
Reading Phillies 1983
Portland Beavers 1984-1986
Maine Guides 1987
Philadelphia Phillies 1987
Tidewater Tides 1988-1989
Richmond Braves 1990

References

External links

1961 births
Living people
Baseball players from Sacramento, California
Major League Baseball shortstops
Philadelphia Phillies players
Richmond Braves players
Sacramento City Panthers baseball players
Helena Phillies players
Maine Guides players
Peninsula Pilots players
Portland Beavers players
Reading Phillies players
Spartanburg Phillies players
Tidewater Tides players